Kevin Murray is the name of:
Kevin Murray (Australian footballer) (born 1938), Australian rules footballer
Kevin Murray (politician) (born 1960), Californian politician
Kevin Murray (American football) (born 1964), College quarterback and current high school coach
Kevin Murray (hurler) (born 1972), Irish hurler for Cork and Cloughduv
Kevin Murray (Irish footballer), Irish Association football player in 1960s
Kevin Murray (cricketer) (born 1963), English county cricketer

See also
Murray (surname)